Crimen en la alcoba ("Crime in the Bedroom") is a 1946 Mexican film. It stars Carlos Orellana.

External links
 

1946 films
1940s Spanish-language films
Mexican black-and-white films
Mexican drama films
1946 drama films
1940s Mexican films